Julius "Jul" Braathe (4 March 1877 – 8 July 1914) was a Norwegian rifle shooter who competed in the early 20th century. Braathe won the gold medal with the Norwegian 300 metre free rifle team at the 1908 Summer Olympics in London. He also competed at the 1906 Intercalated Games and the 1912 Summer Olympics. He died in a drowning accident, 37 years old.

References

1870s births
1914 deaths
Norwegian male sport shooters
ISSF rifle shooters
Olympic gold medalists for Norway
Olympic silver medalists for Norway
Olympic shooters of Norway
Shooters at the 1906 Intercalated Games
Shooters at the 1908 Summer Olympics
Shooters at the 1912 Summer Olympics
Olympic medalists in shooting
Medalists at the 1906 Intercalated Games
Medalists at the 1908 Summer Olympics
Deaths by drowning in Norway